Sérgio Rodrigues (born in 1962) is a Brazilian fiction writer, literary critic, columnist and journalist—winner of the 2014 Prêmio Portugal Telecom de Literatura for his book O drible (published by Companhia das Letras) [The Feint]. His books have been translated to English, French, Spanish and Danish.

Works in English 

 Elza: The Girl (novel, 2014)

Works in Portuguese 

 O homem que matou o escritor (stories, 2000)
 Manual do mané (humor, 2003), with co authors Arthur Dapieve and Gustavo Poli.
 What língua is esta? (chronicles and articles, 2005)
 As sementes de Flowerville (novel, 2006)
 Elza, a garota (novel, 2009)
 Sobrescritos: 40 histórias de escritores, excretores e outros insensatos (stories, 2010)
 O drible (novel, 2013)
 Jules Rimet, meu amor (novel, 2014)
 Viva a língua brasileira! (almanac, 2016)
 Cartas Brasileiras (letter compilation, 2017)

References 

1962 births
Living people
Brazilian journalists
Brazilian columnists
Brazilian literary critics